Yax Yopaat was a Maya king of the Kaan kingdom (Calakmul) who ruled AD 572-579.

His life is mostly a mystery for us today.

A monument at Dzibanche records the celebration of the 9.7.0.0.0 k'atun ending by Yax Yopaat in AD 572; his name also appears on a carved slate mirror-back. As Sky Witness is thought to have died in 572 and Scroll Serpent acceded in 579, this king would have reigned for about six years.

References

Kings of Calakmul
6th century in the Maya civilization
6th-century monarchs in North America